Magnetic tape is a medium for magnetic storage made of a thin, magnetizable coating on a long, narrow strip of plastic film. It was developed in Germany in 1928, based on the earlier magnetic wire recording from Denmark. Devices that use magnetic tape could with relative ease record and playback audio, visual, and binary computer data.  

Magnetic tape revolutionized sound recording and reproduction and broadcasting. It allowed radio, which had always been broadcast live, to be recorded for later or repeated airing. Since the early 1950s, magnetic tape has been used with computers to store large quantities of data and is still used for backup purposes.

Magnetic tape begins to degrade after 10–20 years and therefore is not an ideal medium for long-term archival storage.

Durability 

While good for short-term use, magnetic tape is highly prone to disintegration. Depending on the environment, this process may begin after 10–20 years.

Over time, magnetic tape made in the 1970s and 1980s can suffer from a type of deterioration called sticky-shed syndrome. It is caused by hydrolysis of the binder in the tape and can render the tape unusable.

Successors
Since the introduction of magnetic tape, other technologies have been developed that can perform the same functions, and therefore, replace it. Despite this, technological innovation continues.  Sony and IBM continue to advance tape capacity.

Uses

Audio

Magnetic tape was invented for recording sound by Fritz Pfleumer in 1928 in Germany.

Because of escalating political tensions and the outbreak of World War II, these developments in Germany were largely kept secret. Although the Allies knew from their monitoring of Nazi radio broadcasts that the Germans had some new form of recording technology, its nature was not discovered until the Allies acquired German recording equipment as they invaded Europe at the end of the war. It was only after the war that Americans, particularly Jack Mullin, John Herbert Orr, and Richard H. Ranger, were able to bring this technology out of Germany and develop it into commercially viable formats. Bing Crosby, an early adopter of the technology, made a large investment in the tape hardware manufacturer Ampex.

A wide variety of audiotape recorders and formats have been developed since. Some magnetic tape-based formats include:
 Reel-to-reel
 Fidelipac
 Stereo-Pak
 Perforated (sprocketed) film audio magnetic tape (sepmag, perfotape, sound follower tape, magnetic film)
 8-track tape
 Compact Cassette
 Elcaset
 RCA tape cartridge
 Mini-Cassette
 Microcassette
 Picocassette
 NT (cassette)
 ProDigi
 Digital Audio Stationary Head
 Digital Audio Tape
 Digital Compact Cassette

Video 

Some magnetic tape-based formats include:

Quadruplex videotape
Ampex 2 inch helical VTR
Type A videotape
IVC videotape format
Type B videotape
Type C videotape
EIAJ-1
U-matic
UniHi
Video Cassette Recording
Cartrivision
VHS
VHS-C
S-VHS
Digital S
W-VHS
D-VHS
Video 2000
V-Cord
VX (videocassette format)
Betamax
Compact Video Cassette
Betacam
Betacam SP
Digital Betacam
Betacam SX
MPEG IMX
HDCAM
HDCAM SR
M (videocassette format)
MII (videocassette format)
D-1 (Sony)
DCT (videocassette format)
D-2 (video)
D-3 (video)
D5 HD
D6 HDTV VTR
Video8
Hi8
Digital8
DV
MiniDV
DVCAM
DVCPRO
DVCPRO50
DVCPRO Progressive
DVCPRO HD
HDV
MicroMV

Computer data 

Magnetic tape was first used to record computer data in 1951 on the Eckert-Mauchly UNIVAC I. The system's UNISERVO I tape drive used a thin strip of one-half-inch (12.65  mm) wide metal, consisting of nickel-plated bronze (called Vicalloy). The recording density was 100 characters per inch (39.37  characters/cm) on eight tracks.

In 2002, Imation received a US$11.9 million grant from the U.S. National Institute of Standards and Technology for research into increasing the data capacity of magnetic tape.

In 2014, Sony and IBM announced that they had been able to record 148 gigabits per square inch with magnetic tape media developed using a new vacuum thin-film forming technology able to form extremely fine crystal particles, allowing true tape capacity of 185 TB.

See also 
 Analog recording
 Magnetic developer

Notes

References

External links 

 History of Tape Recording Technology
 The Museum of Obsolete Media

Audiovisual introductions in 1928
Audio storage
Computer storage tape media
Magnetic devices
Sound recording
Tape recording
German inventions
1928 in Germany
1928 in science